Muzeraa (مزيرعة ) is a village in of Basrah Governorate, south Iraq.
It is a31°0′57″N 47°25′50″E, on the east side of the Tigris River at the point where the Tigris, Euphrates and Shatt Al-Arab Rivers converge. It is opposite the city of Al Qurnah and near the Manjoor Oil Fields.

The topography is flat, the elevation is 4m above sea level  and the climate arid.

The area suffered greatly during the Iran–Iraq War, during which it was a major battlefield, and again after the 1991 Iraqi uprising.

References

Populated places in Basra Province